The men's 5000 metres walk event  at the 1993 IAAF World Indoor Championships was held on 13 and 14 March.

Medalists

Results

Heats
First 4 of each heat (Q) and next 2 fastest (q) qualified for the final.

Final

References

5000
Racewalking at the IAAF World Indoor Championships